The 1999 Speedway Grand Prix of Czech Republic was the first race of the 1999 Speedway Grand Prix season. It took place on 8 May in the Marketa Stadium in Prague, Czech Republic It was the third Czech Republic SGP and was won by Pole Tomasz Gollob.

Starting positions draw 

The Speedway Grand Prix Commission nominated Antonín Šváb Jr. (from Czech Republic) and Piotr Protasiewicz (from Poland) as Wild Card.

Heat details

The intermediate classification

See also 
 Speedway Grand Prix
 List of Speedway Grand Prix riders

References

External links 
 FIM-live.com
 SpeedwayWorld.tv

C
Speedway Grand Prix
1999